"Whoa!" is the lead single released from Black Rob's debut album, Life Story. The song was produced by Diggin' in the Crates Crew member Buckwild. Released in early 2000, "Whoa!" became Black Rob's highest chart appearance. 

It narrowly missed the top 40 of the Billboard Hot 100, peaking at number 43, and reached the top 10 on both the R&B and Rap charts. To date, it remains Rob's only solo single to have reached the Hot 100, and his only solo single to have charted during his lifetime.

In addition to Life Story, "Whoa!" has also appeared on the compilations The Source Hip Hop Music Awards 2000, Bad Boy's 10th Anniversary... The Hits, and Bad Boy 20th Anniversary Box Set Edition.

Music video

The video for “Whoa!” was directed by Jeff Richter. It features Rob along with Diddy and a mob of people near a New York street. It then shows Rob entering a strip club complete with TV screens and strippers dancing as he's partying with the people around him. Midway through, Black Rob gets a call from Diddy telling him that he's bringing in the truck, with Black Rob and the other strippers replying to pull up near the fire escape. 

Diddy is driving he turns up the radio volume to listen to the aforementioned song, unaware that he's driving up to a one-way street. He panics as he tries to turn the truck away from incoming cars, spinning it around as it almost hits a man carrying groceries (with both him and Diddy saying the aforementioned title in response to what happened). 

The truck ends up under the fire escape where Black Rob is waiting as he jumps onto the flatbed with fireworks exploding from it. The truck continues to drive along the streets with both Black Rob and Diddy on the flatbed. Intercut are scenes of Rob near a brick background and driving other vehicles at high speed along with his friends.

Sample
The song's sample comes from the instrumental version of François Valéry's song Joy.

Remix
The "Whoa" remix, which is 8:17 long, features (in the order): Rah Digga, Lil' Cease, G-Dep, Da Brat, Beanie Sigel and Black Rob with the intermission from Diddy, Sin (of Da Hoodfellaz), Petey Pablo and Madd Rapper.

Formats and track listing
US 12" Vinyl
A1. "Whoa!" (Radio Mix) – 4:07
A2. "Whoa!" (Club Mix) – 4:10
B1. "Whoa!" (Instrumental) – 4:07
B2. "Whoa!" (Acappella) – 4:10
US CD maxi-single
1. "Whoa!" (Radio Mix) – 4:07
2. "Whoa!" (Instrumental) – 4:10
3. "Call Out Research Hook" – 0:10
Europe CD
1. "Whoa!" (Radio Edit) – 3:05
2. "Whoa!" (Album Version) – 4:05
3. "I Love You Baby" – 3:39

Chart performance

Weekly charts

Year-end charts

References

1999 songs
2000 debut singles
Arista Records singles
Bad Boy Records singles
American hip hop songs
Music videos directed by Jeff Richter
Song recordings produced by Buckwild (music producer)